Milorad Mirčić (born 22 February 1956) is a Serbian politician. He is a prominent figure in the far-right Serbian Radical Party (Srpska radikalna stranka, SRS) and has served several terms as an elected official at the local, provincial, and republic levels. Mirčić was the mayor of Novi Sad from 1993 to 1994 and was minister of the Serb diaspora in the Serbian government from 1998 to 2000. He is now a member of the Novi Sad city assembly.

Early life and private career
Mirčić was born in the village of Maleševci, in what was then the People's Republic of Bosnia and Herzegovina in the Federal People's Republic of Yugoslavia. He graduated as an engineer, specializing in the field of synthetic polymers, and worked for many years at Novkabel.

Politician

Early years (1992–98)

Mayor of Novi Sad
Mirčić was elected to the Novi Sad city assembly in the December 1992 Serbian local elections. The Radical Party emerged in a strengthened position in Novi Sad after the elections and formed an administration with the Socialist Party of Serbia (Socijalistička partija Srbije, SPS). Mirčić, who was then little known in political circles, was chosen as assembly president, a position that was at the time equivalent to mayor. His tenure began in the same month that Bill Clinton was inaugurated as president of the United States. Mirčić he attracted some notoriety during this time for saying that he had two advantages over Clinton: he was younger and more attractive, and he had never cheated on his wife.

While in office, Mirčić oversaw a campaign to remove the names of Tito and other communist-era officials from the city's infrastructure and replace them with the names of other figures from Serbia's past, including Četnik officials such as Petar Bojović. He also removed the city's multi-lingual signs, increased the use of the Cyrillic script, and twinned the city with Ilioupoli in Greece.

Mirčić was defeated in a non-confidence vote in June 1994, having by this time lost the support of the Socialist Party. A writer sympathetic to the Radicals has suggested that Mirčić's continued support for Bosnian Serb forces in the Bosnian War, at a time when the Serbian government was withholding aid and supplies from the Republika Srpska, contributed to this outcome. Mirčić's ill-timed diplomatic visit to Ilioupoli at a time of economic hardship in Novi Sad was also described as a factor.<ref>Gordana Jovanović, "Mirčić – The Right Man to Choose," Velika Srbija" [Radical Party publication], Volume 11 Number 974 (Novi Sad, September 2000), pp 5–8.</ref>

Parliamentarian
Mirčić received the sixth position on the Radical Party's electoral list for Novi Sad in the 1992 Serbian general election, which was held concurrently with the December 1992 local elections. The Radicals won ten mandates in the division, and Mirčić was included in the party's assembly delegation.Službeni Glasnik (Republike Srbije), Volume 49 Number 7 (25 January 1993), p. 194. (From 1992 to 2000, Serbia's electoral law stipulated that one-third of parliamentary mandates would be assigned to candidates from successful lists in numerical order, while the remaining two-thirds would be distributed amongst other candidates on the lists at the discretion of the sponsoring parties. It was common practice for the latter mandates to be awarded out of order. Mirčić's list position did not give him the automatic right to a mandate.) The governing Socialist Party won the election but fell short of a majority, with 101 seats out of 250; the Radicals finished in second place with seventy-three seats. While the Radicals were technically an opposition party in the parliament that followed, they initially worked with the Socialists in an informal alliance. By late 1993, however, the parties had turned against each other and new elections were called.

Mirčić received the fourth position on the Radical Party's list for Novi Sad in the 1993 parliamentary election. The party won seven seats in the division, and Mirčić was again given a mandate.Službeni Glasnik (Republike Srbije), Volume 50 Number 11 (25 January 1994), p. 194. The Socialists won the election and formed a coalition with New Democracy (Nova demokratija, ND), while the Radicals again served in opposition. In September 1994, Mirčić disrupted the proceedings of the assembly to demand an emergency debate on the arrest of Radical Party leader Vojislav Šešelj. When Mirčić refused to yield the floor, speaker Dragan Tomić suspended the sitting.

The July 1995, the leadership of the breakaway Serbian Radical Party – Nikola Pašić (Srpska radikalna stranka – Nikola Pašić, SRS-NP) accused Mirčić and two other SRS parliamentarians of physically preventing Radical Party dissident Aleksandar Đurić from entering the assembly. In the same month, Mirčić was quoted as saying at a Radical Party rally, "I want to create a country called Greater Serbia, with one parliament, one president, one army. We will not stop till our enemies are crushed."

The following year, after the conclusion of the Bosnian War, Mirčić held a press conference in which he accused Serbian president Slobodan Milošević of planning to assassinate Bosnian Serb leader Radovan Karadžić, "because he is afraid that Karadžić might go to the Hague (war crimes tribunal) and tell many unpleasant things there."

Mirčić received the first position on the Radical Party's electoral list for the smaller, redistributed Novi Sad division in the 1997 Serbian parliamentary election and was automatically re-elected when the list won three mandates. The Socialist Party again won the election and the Radicals initially continued to serve in opposition.

Cabinet minister (1998–2000)
The Socialist Party formed a new coalition government with the Yugoslav Left (Jugoslovenska Levica, JUL) and the Radical Party on 24 March 1998, during the early period of the Kosovo War. Mirčić was appointed as minister for the Serb diaspora in the second cabinet of Serbian prime minister Mirko Marjanović.

In November 1998, Mirčić gave an interview in which he discussed the position of Serbs in different republics of the former Socialist Federal Republic of Yugoslavia. He said that the Serb community in Slovenia had been "broken up because no attention [was] being devoted to ethnic minorities," while the government of Croatia, with the support of the international community, was promoting a sham democracy while surreptitiously discriminating against the Serb community in various ways. He added that the situation in Bosnia and Herzegovina was similar to that in Croatia and that Serbs in Macedonia were "trying to secure their basic rights and form their association." In April 1999, after the start of the NATO bombing of Yugoslavia, Mirčić said that members of the Serbian national minority in Albania were being forced to flee to the Federal Republic of Yugoslavia due to physical threats and blackmail.

Mirčić met with recently dismissed Republika Srpska president Nikola Poplašen in September 1999, at a time when Poplašen was still attempting to exercise the office of the presidency and was engaged in a bitter political struggle with Republika Srpska prime minister Milorad Dodik. Mirčić and Poplašen discussed cooperation between Serbia and the Republika Srpska and the issue of dual citizenship; a joint statement that was issued after the meeting blamed Dodik and his administration for blocking links between the two communities."Dismissed Bosnian Serb president, Serbian minister call for closer mutual ties," British Broadcasting Corporation Monitoring European - Political, 8 September 1999. Mirčić later said that Serbs in the Republika Srpska were in a worse position than any other Serb community in the Balkans, insofar as the international community was plotting to destroy their entity.

In October 1999, Mirčić organized a meeting in Belgrade of Serbian language journalists from the international diaspora. He said that the gathering was intended to discuss ways of improving access to information. During his speech to the assembled group, he said, "We have withstood and repelled most brutal physical attacks and have shown that we are capable to fight and defend ourselves. Those who attacked us are now resorting to perfidious methods, not much different from the bombardments in force and intensity — a media war."

Mirčić's term in office came to an end on 24 October 2000, shortly after the defeat of Slobodan Milošević in the 2000 Yugoslavian general election. A caretaker administration was established in Serbia pending new elections, and the Radicals returned to opposition.

After the fall of Milošević (2000–07)
Serbia's electoral system was reformed prior to the 2000 parliamentary election in December, with the entire country becoming a single constituency and all mandates being awarded to candidates at the discretion of the sponsoring parties, irrespective of numerical order. Mirčić received the sixth position on the Radical Party's electoral list and was included in its assembly delegation after the party won twenty-three seats.PRVA KONSTITUTIVNA SEDNICA, 22.01.2001., Otvoreni Parlament, accessed 29 December 2001. The Democratic Opposition of Serbia (Demokratska opozicija Srbije, DOS) won a landslide victory in this election, and the Radicals again served in opposition.

Mirčić received the eighth position on the Radical Party's list in the 2003 election. The Radicals won eighty-two seats, emerging as the largest group in the assembly but falling well short of a majority and ultimately remaining in opposition. Mirčić was again included in the party's assembly delegation and chaired the defence and security committee in the parliament that followed."Serbian Assembly security committees, top brass meet to discuss clashes," British Broadcasting Corporation Monitoring European, 17 March 2004 (Source: Tanjug news agency, Belgrade, in English 1540 gmt 17 Mar 04). In November 2004, he and Venko Aleksandrov (the chair of Bulgaria's foreign policy, defence, and security committee) signed an accord for greater cooperation between their countries. Mirčić paid an official visit to Bulgaria the following year in his role as committee chair. During this time, he was also a member of the administrative committee and the committee on relations with Serbs outside Serbia.

In March 2004, Mirčić accused ethnic Albanian "separatists" in Kosovo-Metohija of conducting coordinated actions against Serbs in the disputed territory and called for the Serbian government to take all necessary actions to protect the Kosovo Serb community. He also condemned the burning of mosques in Belgrade and Niš in the same period. In December 2004, he said that Albanian separatists in Kosovo were "waiting for helicopters and state-of-the-art small arms to be delivered to them from Croatia" and accused the groups in question of planning a campaign of ethnic cleansing against Serbs.

Mirčić appeared on the Radical Party's electoral lists for the republic elections of 2007 and 2008, although he did not take a seat on either occasion.

Provincial politics (2000–12)
Mirčić sought election to the Assembly of Vojvodina for Novi Sad's seventh division in the 2000 provincial election. He was defeated by Dragan Milošević of the Democratic Opposition of Serbia.

The 2000 provincial election was the last to be held entirely by voting in single-member constituencies; after the election, Vojvodina adopted a system of mixed proportional representation, in which half the candidates were elected in constituencies and the other half by proportional representation on electoral lists. Mirčić was elected for Novi Sad's redistributed seventh division in the 2004 provincial election, winning in the second round of voting. As in the republican election a year earlier, the Radicals emerged as the largest party in the assembly but fell short of a majority and ultimately served in opposition. Mirčić led the Radical Party caucus in the assembly term that followed.

In early 2008, Mirčić accused the European Union of encouraging Serb refugees from Croatia now living in Vojvodina to return to their former homes in order to turn Serbs into a minority in Vojvodina and separate the province from Serbia. His political rivals accused him of fomenting ethnic tensions with these comments. The Alliance of Vojvodina Hungarians (Savez vojvođanskih Mađara, SVM) subsequently condemned Mirčić's statement that inter-ethnic clashes could occur in Vojvodina communities with Hungarian majorities if Hungary recognized Kosovo's declaration of independence.

Mirčić was a Radical Party vice-president at the republic level in this period and continued to speak for the party on a variety of issues. He opposed the prospect of Serbia joining the North Atlantic Treaty Organization (NATO) in 2007, saying, "The United States is creating hotspots in the world and NATO does the dirtiest work in the field. We do not want to be a part of that." He also said, "by joining NATO, [Serbia] would be making a major concession to the advocates of independence for Kosmet [Kosovo-Metohija], because the alliance's strategy is not to interfere in internal conflicts in its member-nations." Ultimately, Serbia did not join the military alliance.

Mirčić appeared in the lead position on the Radical Party's electoral list in the 2008 provincial election. The Radicals suffered an unexpectedly poor result in this election, winning only twenty-four seats out of 120; the election was won outright by the For a European Vojvodina alliance led by the Democratic Party (Demokratska stranka, DS). Mirčić continued to lead the Radical Party group in the assembly and, from the opposition benches, accused the provincial government of pursuing a secessionist agenda. He opposed the Statute of the Autonomous Province of Vojvodina, describing it as a blueprint for a "state within a state.""Serbia: Vojvodina opposition objects to province's draft statute," British Broadcasting Corporation Monitoring European, 3 October 2008 (Source: Dnevnik website, Novi Sad, in Serbian 24 Sep 08).

Following the inconclusive outcome of the 2008 Serbian parliamentary election (which took place concurrently with the provincial election), serious discussions took place between the Radical Party, the Democratic Party of Serbia (Demokratska stranka Srbije, DSS), and the Socialist Party about forming a new coalition government, and rumours circulated that Mirčić would be appointed as minister of internal affairs. Ultimately, these plans came to nothing. The Socialists formed a coalition with the For a European Serbia alliance, and the Radicals remained in opposition.

Following the Serbian government's arrest and deportation of Radovan Karadžić in mid-2008, Mirčić accused United Kingdom Special Forces groups of taking part in the operation to capture Karadžić and described the government of Serbian president Boris Tadić as traitorous.

The Radical Party experienced a serious split in late 2008, with several members joining the more moderate Serbian Progressive Party (Srpska napredna stranka'', SNS) under the leadership of Tomislav Nikolić and Aleksandar Vučić. Mirčić, considered a prominent member of party leader Vojislav Šešelj's hardline faction, remained with the Radicals. When Nikolić set up a parliamentary group composed of ex-Radicals, Mirčić accused him of an illegal "snatching of mandates."

The Radicals, seriously weakened by the 2008 split, fell to only four seats in the Vojvodina Assembly in the 2012 provincial election. Mirčić was defeated in his bid for re-election in Novi Sad's seventh constituency seat.

Return to the National Assembly (2016–20)
Serbia's electoral system was reformed again in 2011, such that parliamentary mandates were awarded in numerical order to candidates on successful lists. Mirčić was not a candidate in the 2012 Serbian parliamentary election but received the fourth position on the Radical Party's list for the 2014 election. The party did not, on this occasion, cross the electoral threshold to win representation in the assembly.

Mirčić again appeared in the fourth position on the Radical Party's list for the 2016 parliamentary election and was elected to his sixth assembly term when the list won twenty-two seats. The election was won by the Progressive Party and its allies, and the Radicals again served in an opposition. During the 2016–20 parliament, Mirčić was a member of the committee on finance, state budget, and control of public spending; a member of the agriculture, forestry, and water management committee; a deputy member of the defence and internal affairs committee, the security services control committee, and the committee on administrative, budgetary, mandate, and immunity issues; a member of Serbia's delegation to the Interparliamentary Assembly on Orthodoxy; and a member of the parliamentary friendship groups with Belarus, Russia, and Venezuela.

Mirčić was promoted to the second position on the Radical Party's list in the 2020 Serbian parliamentary election. In the 2022 parliamentary election, he appeared in the fifth position. In both cases, the list failed to cross the electoral threshold.

City politics since 2000
Mirčić has served several terms in the Novi Sad city assembly since standing down as mayor in 1994. He was defeated in his bid for re-election to the assembly in the 2000 local elections but returned in 2004. In the 2008 local elections, he was a candidate but chose not to take a mandate.

Mirčić appeared in the second position on the Radical Party's lists for Novi Sad in the 2012, 2016, and 2020 Serbian local elections and was re-elected each time. He is still a member of the city assembly as of 2022.

Electoral record

Provincial (Vojvodina)

Local (City of Novi Sad)

References

1956 births
Living people
People from Maleševci, Bosansko Grahovo
Mayors of Novi Sad
Members of the National Assembly (Serbia)
Members of the Assembly of Vojvodina
Members of the Interparliamentary Assembly on Orthodoxy
Serbian Radical Party politicians
Serbs of Bosnia and Herzegovina